Davydovka is a rural locality (a selo) and the administrative center of Davydovskoye Rural Settlement, Dubovsky District, Volgograd Oblast, Russia. The population was 732 as of 2010. There are 14 streets.

Geography 
Davydovka is located in steppe, 37 km northwest of Dubovka (the district's administrative centre) by road. Pryamaya Balka is the nearest rural locality.

References 

Rural localities in Dubovsky District, Volgograd Oblast